Sangbad Lahari was a Bengali daily newspaper published from Guwahati, Assam, India. Sangbad Lahari was launched in 2009 in Guwahati and later its Meghalaya edition was started in July, 2011. It was Meghalaya's first Bengali newspaper.  The owner of the newspaper was Shillong Times Pvt Ltd, Meghalaya. 

Management has decided to close down the publication of Sangbad Lahari from 1 April 2014.

References 

Bengali-language newspapers published in India
Publications established in 2009
2009 establishments in Assam
Mass media in Guwahati
Newspapers published in Assam